The Season is a Christmas album and the fourth studio album by the American singer and songwriter Steve Perry. It was released on November 5, 2021, by Fantasy Records.

It debuted at number 6 on the Billboard Top Album Sales chart.

A Digital Deluxe Edition with 2 additional songs was released on October 28, 2022.

Critical reception
Louder gave the album two and a half stars, saying, "if you’re hoping to hear any trace of the rock stylings that made Perry famous, then it’s probably best skip this gooey, Buble-esque affair."

RIFF Magazine said, "Does the world need a Steve Perry Christmas record? Beyond the shadow of any human doubt … no. It doesn’t."

Track listing

Personnel
Credits for The Season adapted from liner notes.

Musicians
 Steve Perry – lead and backing vocals
 Dallas Kruse – piano, bass, synth, backing vocals
 Vinnie Colaiuta – drums

Technical
 Steve Perry – additional orchestration, mixing
 Dallas Kruse – drum programming
 Thom Flowers – engineering, mixing, co-production
 Adam Ayan – mastering
 Jeff Wack – artwork, design

Charts

References

2021 Christmas albums
Steve Perry albums
Fantasy Records albums